Mary Crovatt Hambidge (1885-1973) was born in Brunswick, Georgia in 1885 and became an influential weaver in the north Georgia mountains, leaving behind an organization devoted to the artists, which later became known as the Hambidge Center for Creative Arts and Sciences.

Early life 
Hambidge was educated in Cambridge, MA at the Lee School For Girls. She moved to New York, NY in the 1910s to pursue her acting aspirations where she met illustrator and art theorist Jay Hambidge. During a visit to Greece in 1920-1921, Mary Hambidge apprenticed as a weaver at the foot of the Acropolis and continued weaving after her return to New York. Seeking more affordable housing in the late 1920s, she moved to Rabun County in the north Georgia mountains and began meeting spinners and weavers in the area. In 1934, she moved her small weaving operations to an 800-acre property including buildings and pastures on Bettys' Creek Road, which she was later able to purchase with the help of a benefactor, Eleanor Steele Reese. Her enterprise became incorporated in 1941 as the Jay Hambidge Art Foundation.

Career 
Mary Hambidge dedicated her life to the theories of  "dynamic symmetry," developed by Jay Hambidge, a design theory that links human art objects with natural laws of growth and balance. She was also greatly influenced by Greek culture and the Delphic revival of the 1920s and '30s, spearheaded by her friend and mentor, Eva Palmer-Sikelianos. In 1937, Hambidge and Eleanor Steele Reese opened a small crafts store on Fifth Avenue in Manhattan, Rabun Studios, that sold yardage from the Weavers of Rabun, her weaving enterprise in north Georgia that included extensive farming operations. Over the next 20 years, she would receive international honors and be invited to show her work at the Smithsonian and the Museum of Modern Art.

Legacy 
In the last decade of her life, Mary Hambidge focused more on developing a community for artists and craftspeople, which became a renowned artist's retreat after her death in 1973. As one of the first artist communities in the U.S., the Hambidge Center has a distinguished history of supporting individual artists in a residency program. The Center also continues to act as a steward of its extraordinary location in the foothills of the Blue Ridge Mountains.

In 2017, a 30-minute documentary about Mary Hambidge's life was produced by Atlanta filmmaker Hal Jacobs.

References 

 Troy, Virginia Gardner, "The Great Weaver of Eternity: Dynamic Symmetry and Utopian Ideology in the Art and Writing of Mary Hambidge," Surface Design Journal, Vol. 23, No 4, Summer.

American women artists
People from Georgia (U.S. state)
Artist colonies
American weavers
American textile designers
1885 births
1973 deaths
Women textile artists